Mimacronia arnaudi is a species of beetle in the family Cerambycidae. It was described by Karl-Ernst Hüdepohl in 1983. It is endemic to the Philippines.

References

Pteropliini
Beetles described in 1983